Aguarunichthys torosus, the Bolt Catfish or Yellow-band Catfish, is a species of benthopelagic catfish of the family Pimelodidae that is native to Cenepa River basin in Amazon River drainage of Peru.

It is only found in Río Marañón in the upper Amazon basin of Peru. It grows to a length of 346 mm.

References

Pimelodidae
Catfish of South America
Freshwater fish of Peru
Taxa named by Donald J. Stewart
Fish described in 1986